Thomas Edward Maxwell (born September 19, 1965) is an American songwriter, singer, and musician. Most notably, Maxwell is the former lead singer of the swing revival band Squirrel Nut Zippers. He wrote the single "Hell" from the 1996 platinum-certified album Hot.

Early life
Thomas Edward Maxwell was born to Joseph Maxwell and Nancy (Miller) Maxwell in Ft. Lauderdale, Florida, in September 1965. In 1972, their family moved to Burnsville.

In elementary school, Maxwell began playing alto sax, and at the age of 14, he taught himself to play the drums. When he was seventeen he left home to go to the University of North Carolina at Chapel Hill, where he started his first band, Teasing the Korean, with fellow UNC classmate John Ensslin. In 1990, Teasing the Korean became What Peggy Wants, and they were signed to a local Chapel Hill label, Moist/Baited Breath. In December 1993, What Peggy Wants broke up.

During his time in What Peggy Wants, Maxwell befriended Metal Flake Mother drummer Jimbo Mathus. In 1992, until Metal Flake Mother disbanded, Mathus became lead guitarist and Maxwell briefly joined as the band's drummer. In 1993, Mathus, along with Mathus' then girlfriend Katherine Whalen, Ken Mosher, Don Raleigh, and Chris Phillips, formed the neo-swing, pre-war jazz revival group Squirrel Nut Zippers. They played a couple of local shows and recorded a three-track EP on Merge Records, Roasted Right. In January 1994, Maxwell was asked to join the band.

Career

Squirrel Nut Zippers
The band signed with Mammoth Records in the summer of 1994. They recorded their first record, The Inevitable, a few months later in Hillsborough, North Carolina. In the summer of 1995, Maxwell, Mosher, and Mathus took a trip to New Orleans, Louisiana to visit their friend, Blind Melon drummer Glen Graham. Graham had been recording Soup with Blind Melon at Daniel Lanois' Kingsway Studios earlier that year.

In October 1995, the band went to New Orleans to record the Hot album at Kingsway Studios. They produced the record with the help of Mike Napolitano. They recorded Hot in six days, and the record was released in June 1996. The record went certified gold in May 1997, and by September of that year it was RIAA certified platinum, selling over 1.3 million copies. They had a hit with Maxwell's song "Hell", a single tone calypso about Hell. That year it charted at No. 13 on Billboard Hot 100.

In 1999, Tom Maxwell and Ken Mosher both left the band, due to a management agreement that the band had signed without their knowledge. The band refused to pay royalties to either of them, which led to a five-year legal battle. They settled out of court for $155,000, but the band breached the settlement and the two were only awarded a fraction of the money. This led to an irreparable relationship between Maxwell/Mosher and Mathus/Whalen.

In late December 2015, Maxwell published a piece on Medium explaining why he will not be a part of the Squirrel Nut Zipper's tour in late-2016. The band plans to reissue Hot for its 20-year anniversary, for which 1/3 of the record's material was written by Maxwell and Mosher, including both singles which were penned by Maxwell.

2000–present
In 1999, Maxwell recorded his first solo album, Samsara, at Kingsway Studios. He toured for the record with SNZ members Ken Mosher and Chris Phillips, along with Ben Folds Five bassist Robert Sledge. Through the legal turmoil with SNZ and the birth of his first child, Maxwell stopped touring in 2000, and did not tour again until 2015.

For several years following their departure from the band, he worked with Ken Mosher, contributing songs and scores for films and television, including season 1 of Lovespring International and the animated film Happily N'ever After.

In 2006, just days after he and his first wife separated, Maxwell's three-year-old son was diagnosed with leukemia. Maxwell retreated from his musical career and focused on shepherding his son through a three-and-a-half-year treatment. His son made a full recovery and, in 2009, Maxwell returned to music. In 2011, he released his first studio album in over a decade, Kingdom Come.

In 2014, Maxwell released his first record with The Minor Drag, Tom Maxwell & The Minor Drag, produced by longtime producer Mike Napolitano. Maxwell also wrote a memoir titled Hell – My Life In the Squirrel Nut Zippers, in which he talks about his experience in the band, his time on the road, and the recording of the band's albums.

In 2014, Maxwell and his family moved into Poplar Hill, a historic Greek Revival mansion in Hillsborough, North Carolina. They rented the former plantation home, which had once belonged to tobacco industrialist and white supremacist Julian Carr, but broke their lease due to what they reported were various hauntings.

Maxwell is a successful freelance writer. He has contributed to Al Jazeera America, as well as publications including Slate, Oxford American, Salon, Southern Cultures, and Bitter Southerner.

References

1965 births
Living people
Musicians from Fort Lauderdale, Florida
University of North Carolina alumni
Squirrel Nut Zippers members
Singer-songwriters from Florida